Emerson is a former provincial electoral division in the Canadian province of Manitoba.  It was created by redistribution in 1879 and eliminated prior the 2019 general election.  Most of its territory was redistributed to the newly created Borderland riding.  The eastern part of the former riding was transferred to the La Verendrye riding.

It was located in the southeastern corner of the province.  It is bordered to the north by Carman, Morris, Steinbach and La Verendrye, to the west by Pembina, to the east by the province of Ontario and to the south by the American state of North Dakota.   The riding included the communities/municipalities of Emerson, Altona, Dominion City, Rhineland, Gretna, Woodridge and St. Jean Baptiste.

The riding's population in 2008 was 20,370. In 2011, the average family income was $61,951, and the unemployment rate was 2.9%. Agriculture accounted for 24% of the riding's industry, followed by manufacturing at 16%. Over 27% of Emerson's residents had less than a Grade Nine education.  Emerson was an ethnically diverse riding, with only 51% of its residents listing English as their mother tongue.  26% of the riding's residents listed themselves as either German, French, Ukrainian, Polish or Mennonite, while a further 5% were aboriginal.

List of provincial representatives

Electoral results

1879 general election

1880 by-election

1883 general election

1883 by-election

1886 general election

1888 general election

1892 general election

1896 general election

1899 general election

1900 by-election

1903 general election

1907 general election

1910 general election

1914 general election

1915 general election

1920 general election

1922 general election

1927 general election

1932 general election

1936 general election

1941 general election

1945 general election

1949 general election

1953 general election

1957 by-election

1958 general election

1959 general election

1962 general election

1966 general election

1969 general election

1973 general election

1977 general election

1981 general election

1986 general election

1988 general election

1990 general election

1995 general election

1999 general election

2003 general election

2007 general election

2011 general election

2016 general election

Previous boundaries

References

Former provincial electoral districts of Manitoba
Emerson, Manitoba